Balat is a village in the District of Didim, Aydın Province, Turkey. As of 2010, it had a population of 1110 people. The ruins of the ancient Greek city of Miletus are near the village.

References

Villages in Didim District
Miletus